Empire is a computer software for semiempirical Molecular Orbital calculations designed to run in parallel on multi-core desktop computers and on massively parallel supercomputers. Empire is used to calculate chemical structures and is able to calculate large systems such as proteins .

References

Biological techniques and tools
Molecular modelling
Molecular modelling software
Bioinformatics software